The tapaculos  or tapacolos  are a family, Rhinocryptidae, of small suboscine passerine birds, found mainly in  South America and with the highest diversity in the Andean regions. Three species (Chocó, Tacarcuna, and the silvery-fronted) are found in southern Central America.

Description

Tapaculos are small to medium-sized birds, with a total length ranging from 10–24 cm (4–9½ in). These are terrestrial species that fly only poorly on their short wings. They have strong legs, well-suited to their habitat of grassland or forest undergrowth. The tail is cocked and pointed towards the head, and the name tapaculo probably derives from Spanish for loincloth (literally "cover your behind" --because it ought to). Another possible explanation is that it originates from the Chilean name for the white-throated tapaculo, simply tapaculo, which is an onomatopoeic reference to its commonly heard song.

While the majority of the family are small blackish or brown birds there are some larger and more colourful species. All tapaculos are skulking birds that frequently stay low in dense vegetation, even the larger, colorful species, and this renders them difficult to see. They are best located and – in the case of Scytalopus spp. – identified by their vocalisations.

They feed on insects, seeds and other soft plant material with their pointed bills, and will scratch on the ground like a pheasant.
 
Most species lay two or three white eggs in a covered location, whether it be a burrow, a hole in a tree, or a domed nest.

Status and conservation
Some species have highly localized distributions and, being poor fliers, they easily become isolated in small populations. BirdLife International currently (2007) consider one species vulnerable (Scytalopus panamensis), three species endangered (S. iraiensis, S. rodriguezi and S. robbinsi), and two species critically endangered (Eleoscytalopus psychopompus and Merulaxis stresemanni). The two critically endangered species are restricted to Atlantic forest of eastern Brazil, and were only recently rediscovered after several years without any records.

Taxonomy
The tapaculos were traditionally placed in a distinct family Rhinocryptidae; more recent research indicates that according to analysis of mt and nDNA sequence data, the tapaculos might be better merged into the Formicariidae as tribe Rhinocryptini, as they are closer to the antthrushes than either is to the true antpittas.

An alternative family name Pteroptochidae, has been used historically.

The phylogenetic tree shown below is based on a large-scale genetic study of the suboscines by Michael Harvey and collaborators that was published in 2020. The species numbers are from the list maintained by the International Ornithologists' Union (IOC).

The species-limits within the genus Scytalopus have historically been difficult to determine. The birds are highly cryptic, and identification using visual features often is impossible. Vocal and biochemical data is typically needed to clarify the taxonomic status of the various populations. Several new species have been described in recent years (e.g. S. whitneyi and S. frankeae from Peru). The Brazilian taxa are similarly complex with several recently described species and considerable confusion surrounding the use of the scientific name Scytalopus speluncae.

Additionally, still undescribed species are known to exist, while some species as currently defined actually may include several species (e.g. the southern population of the large-footed tapaculo may represent a yet undescribed species). The confusing situation is perhaps best illustrated by the fact that only ten species were recognized in this genus in 1970, while the figure now is more than four times as high.

Species list
For a complete list of the tapaculos recognized by the International Ornithological Congress, see the article "List of tapaculo species".

Genera allied with antthrushes
Genus Pteroptochos, the huet-huets
 Black-throated huet-huet, Pteroptochos tarnii
 Chestnut-throated huet-huet, Pteroptochos castaneus
 Moustached turca, Pteroptochos megapodius
Genus Scytalopus (some 40-45 species)
Genus Scelorchilus
 White-throated tapaculo, Scelorchilus albicollis
 Chucao tapaculo, Scelorchilus rubecula
Genus Rhinocrypta
 Crested gallito, Rhinocrypta lanceolata
Genus Liosceles
 Rusty-belted tapaculo, Liosceles thoracicus

Placement unresolved
Genus Psilorhamphus
 Spotted bamboowren, Psilorhamphus guttatus
Genus Merulaxis, the bristlefronts
 Slaty bristlefront, Merulaxis ater
 Stresemann's bristlefront, Merulaxis stresemanni
Genus Eleoscytalopus (formerly in Scytalopus)
 White-breasted tapaculo, Eleoscytalopus indigoticus
 Bahia tapaculo, Eleoscytalopus psychopompus
Genus Eugralla
 Ochre-flanked tapaculo, Eugralla paradoxa
Genus Myornis
 Ash-colored tapaculo, Myornis senilis
Genus Acropternis
 Ocellated tapaculo, Acropternis orthonyx

References

Cited sources

External links

Tapaculo videos on the Internet Bird Collection

Formicariidae
Higher-level bird taxa restricted to the Neotropics

Taxa named by Alexander Wetmore